The 2010 Bronze Helmet (BK) is the 2010 version of the Bronze Helmet speedway event organized by the Polish Motor Union (PZM). The Final take place on 5 August at Alfred Smoczyk Stadium in Leszno and was won by Patryk Dudek of Zielona Góra who beat Maciej Janowski of Wrocław and Przemysław Pawlicki of Gorzów Wielkopolski.

Semi-final

Rzeszów 
  Rzeszów
 8 July 2010
 Referee: Zdzisław Fyda (Kraków)
 Beat Time: 69.46 - Przemysław Pawlicki in Heat 11
 Attendance: 400
 Reference: 
Changes:
Draw 6. Kamil Pulczyński (TOR) → Reserve 17. Dawid Bąk
Draw 11. Patryk Kociemba (WRO) → Reserve 18. Łukasz Bojarski
Draw 12. Rafał Malczewski (CZE) → Mateusz Wieczorek
Draw 16. Kacper Rogowski (ZIE) → Reserve 19. Artur Czaja

Gniezno 
  Gniezno
 8 July 2010
 Referee: Krzysztof Meyze
 Beat Time: 64.71 - Maciej Janowski in Heat 10
 Attendance: 500
 Reference: 
Change:
Draw 14. Kamil Cieślar (CZE) → Reserve 17. Maciej Fajfer

Reserve 18 - in Heats 16 and 19
Reserve 19 - in Heat 19
unknown gate for reserve riders in heat 19

The Final 
  Leszno, Alfred Smoczyk Stadium
 5 August 2009
 Referee: Tomasz Proszowski
 Beat Time: 61.41 - Patryk Dudek in Heat 10
 Attendance: 800
 Reference: 
 Change:
 Draw 13. injured one day before the Final, at the League of Juniors Damian Adamczak (BYD) → Reserve

See also 
 2010 Individual Speedway Junior Polish Championship

References 

2010
Helmet Bronze